Yu Xiuhua (born 1976) is a Chinese poet. She lives in the small village of Hengdian, Shipai, Zhongxiang, Hubei, China, and has cerebral palsy resulting in speech and mobility difficulties. Despite this, she still writes poetry, and  Xiuhua had written over two thousand poems. In 2014, her poem I Crossed Half of China to Sleep with You  was reposted frequently in WeChat, leading to a significant increase in her notoriety. In the same year, the poem magazine, a national magazine of China, published her poetry, which made her work even more famous. Still Tomorrow a documentary about her rise to fame and relationship with her family as well as her divorce from her husband, was released in 2016, and has been showcased in different film festivals. Moonlight Rests on My Left Palm, a collection of poems and essays in poet and translator Fiona Sze-Lorrain's translation, is out from Astra House in 2021.

Biography

Life in Hengdian village 
In 1976, Yu Xiuhua was born in Hengdian, Shipai, Zhongxiang, Hubei, China to a family of farmers. Due to breech presentation and hypoxia, she was born with cerebral palsy, making speaking and mobilizing difficult. When Yu grew up, she could neither do farm work nor attend university because of her disability. In her second year of high school, she stopped her studies and stayed at home out of work. After that, poetry became a strong focus.

Before 2015, Yu still lived in Hengdian with her parents, leading a simple life. At home, she did some housework, fed the rabbits and wrote her poetry. In Hengdian's rural setting, Yu did not have an audience for her work.

Family 
In 1995, when Yu was 19, she entered an arranged marriage organised by her mother. Yu married Yin Shiping, 12 years her elder. He was not often home, and when they were together, they always quarreled. The marriage produced a son. Yu Xiuhua and Yin Shiping divorced in September 2015.

Yu's parents continued to provide for her until her anthology was published.

In 2016, Yu's mother died of lung cancer.

Writing experience 
In 1998, Yu Xiuhua wrote her first poem "Imprinting (）".

In 2009, Yu Xiuhua started to write poetry regularly. Her poetry includes themes of her love, affection, life sentiment, her disability and the closed village she cannot escape. [9]

In November 2014, the poem magazine published her poems.

In January 2015, Yu's first anthology of poems, “The moonlight falls on my left hand (）” was published by Guangxi Normal University Press. On 28 January, Yu was elected vice chairman of Zhongxiang City Writers Association of Hubei Province. In February of the same year, Hunan Literature and Art Publishing House published her poetry collection, "Still Tomorrow（）".

On 15 May 2016, Yu Xiuhua's third book "We loved and then forgot (）" was published in Beijing. On 1 November 2016, in the third Chinese "Peasant Literature Award" ceremony, Yu Xiuhua won the special  "Peasant Literature Award", and received a 100,000 yuan bonus.

In March 2022, in response to the Russian invasion of Ukraine, Yu published a poem titled “Prayer”, where she criticised the invasion. In response, she was subjected to trolling by internet users who maintained a pro-Russian stance. Eventually, the poem was taken down from Chinese social media platforms by censors.

Works 
Anthology of poems
 The Moonlight Rests on My Left Hand, (in Chinese, "Yue Guang Luo Zai Zuo Shou Shang"), 2015
 Still Tomorrow, 2015
 We Loved and Then Forgot, 2016
Stop #8: poems by Yu Xiuhua, The Caravan: Contemporary Chinese Poetry, Edited and translated by Jin Zhong

Characteristics of her poetry 
Yu Xiuhua's poetry includes themes of her love, affection, life sentiment, her disability and the closed village she cannot escape.

She wrote many love poems. As a woman living in the bottom of society and with disabilities, she has a very deep experience of the lack of love. She is not satisfied with the poetic desire of love, but strongly shows the complex and distinctive female subject image.

Her poems are filled with the complex meaning of love and the calling, the disillusionment of love and the realization. Love is what makes the poet ask questions about existence, truth, death and other metaphysical problems and ontological subjects.

References 

21st-century Chinese poets
Chinese women poets
1976 births
Living people
Chinese people with disabilities
Outsider artists
People with cerebral palsy
Writers with disabilities
People from Jingmen
Poets from Hubei
21st-century Chinese women writers